Back River is a tidal estuary in Baltimore County, Maryland, located about  east of the city of Baltimore. The river is shared between Essex, MD, Dundalk, MD, and Edgemere, MD

Water quality 

Back River is in a highly urbanized area and is subject to extensive urban runoff and other forms of water pollution. The Maryland Department of the Environment has listed water quality impairments in the mainstem river for chlordane (a pesticide), and nutrients (nitrogen and phosphorus). The Herring Run tributary is listed as impaired due to high levels of bacteria. The Baltimore County Department of Environmental Protection and Resource Management (DEPRM) has classified Bread and Cheese Creek as having a “Very High Priority” for stormwater management actions, due to the large amount of trash and sediment found in it. The county recommends implementing a number of remedial activities to control urban runoff pollution, including "downspout disconnection, storm drain marking, buffer improvement, alley retrofit, street sweeping, tree planting and public education."

Tributaries 
 Armistead Run
 Biddison Run
 Bread and Cheese Creek
 Brien’s Run
 Chinquapin Run
 Deep Creek
 Duck Creek
 Herring Run
 Moore’s Run
 Northeast Creek
 Redhouse Run
 Stemmers Run
 Tiffany Run

See also 
 List of rivers of Maryland

References 

 United States Geological Survey. Reston, VA. "Back River." Geographic Names Information System (GNIS). Accessed 2009-08-28.

External links 
 Back River Restoration Committee
 Clean Bread and Cheese Creek
Blue Water Baltimore, formed in 2010 from a merger of the Gwynns Falls, Jones Falls, Herring Run, and Baltimore Harbor Watershed Associations, and the Baltimore Harbor Waterkeeper

Rivers of Baltimore County, Maryland
Tributaries of the Chesapeake Bay
Rivers of Maryland